The Deyma is a river in Russia's Kaliningrad Oblast. It separates from the Pregolya at Gvardeysk, flows through Polessk, and ends at the Curonian Lagoon. The Polessk Canal connects the Deima with the Nemunas.

Rivers of Kaliningrad Oblast
0Deyma